Shunwei Capital is a Beijing-based venture capital firm founded in 2011. It was founded by Lei Jun (the founder and CEO of Xiaomi) and Tuck Lye Koh. The firm focuses on investing in the technology sector in China as well as other countries such as India and Indonesia. According to South China Morning Post, from January 2019 to May 2020, it was the ninth most active venture capital firm in China.

Background 
Shunwei Capital was founded in 2011 by Lei Jun and Tuck Lye Koh. Both of them were experienced with the technology scene in China. Lei was previously the CEO of Kingsoft until 2007 as well as founder of Xiaomi in 2010 while Koh was a Singaporean who worked in China for GIC and C.V. Starr Investment Advisors dealing with technology investments.

The firm provides growth capital to internet and technology companies mainly in China but also in other countries such as India and Indonesia. Investments have been made by the firm in telecommunications, digital media, video games, rural internet, and financial technology sectors. As of 2020, the firm has invested in over 400 companies. 

Investors of the firm include sovereign wealth funds, funds of funds, university endowment funds and family offices.

Shunwei Capital's name comes from a Chinese idiom (順勢而為) that means "to leverage a trend to achieve greatness".

Funds

Notable investments 

 Pionex
 Xiaomi
 Nio
 iQiyi
 YY.com
 Webull
 Xpeng Motors
 CloudWalk Technology
 Momenta
 Zomato
 Misfit
 Sharechat
 Pratilipi
 Truebil
 Koo
 Gojek

References

External links
 www.shunwei.com (Company Website)

Chinese companies established in 2011
Financial services companies established in 2011
Investment management companies of China
Venture capital firms of China